The Washakie LDS Ward Chapel is a historic one-story building in Washakie, Utah. It was built in 1939 for the Church of Jesus Christ of Latter-day Saints, and designed in the Colonial Revival style by architect Edward O. Anderson. It has been listed on the National Register of Historic Places since June 3, 1998.

References

Buildings and structures completed in 1939
Colonial Revival architecture in Utah
National Register of Historic Places in Box Elder County, Utah
Meetinghouses of the Church of Jesus Christ of Latter-day Saints in Utah
1939 establishments in Utah